Çetin Şahiner (13 October 1934 – 3 August 2017) was a Turkish hurdler. He competed in the 110 metres hurdles at the 1960 Summer Olympics and the 1964 Summer Olympics.

References

1934 births
2017 deaths
Athletes (track and field) at the 1960 Summer Olympics
Athletes (track and field) at the 1964 Summer Olympics
Turkish male hurdlers
Turkish male high jumpers
Olympic athletes of Turkey
Sportspeople from Ankara
Mediterranean Games bronze medalists for Turkey
Mediterranean Games medalists in athletics
Athletes (track and field) at the 1955 Mediterranean Games
Athletes (track and field) at the 1959 Mediterranean Games